Filip Sakala (born 21 May 1996) is a Czech Ski jumper. He competed in the 2022 Winter Olympics. 

He is the son of 1992 Winter Olympic Team Large Hill bronze medalist ski jumper Jaroslav Sakala.

References

External links

1996 births
Living people
Czech male ski jumpers
Olympic ski jumpers of the Czech Republic
Ski jumpers at the 2022 Winter Olympics
Sportspeople from Nový Jičín